Vadzim Mytnik (born 5 July 1988) is a Belarusian former professional football player.

His father Ihar Mytnik played football professionally in the 1980s and 1990s.

External links
 
 

1988 births
Living people
Belarusian footballers
FC Molodechno players
FC Dinamo Minsk players
FC Veras Nesvizh players
FC Dnepr Mogilev players
FC Klechesk Kletsk players
FC SKVICH Minsk players
FC Volna Pinsk players
FC Bereza-2010 players
FC Minsk players
Association football defenders